Wasatch–Cache National Forest is a United States National Forest located primarily in northern Utah (81.23%), with smaller parts extending into southeastern Idaho (16.42%) and southwestern Wyoming (2.35%). The name is derived from the Ute word Wasatch for a low place in high mountains, and the French word Cache meaning to hide. The term cache originally referred to fur trappers, the first Europeans to visit the land. The Wasatch–Cache National Forest boundaries include  of land.

Wasatch–Cache was headquartered in downtown Salt Lake City, Utah until August 2007 when its management was combined with the Uinta National Forest and is currently being managed as the Uinta–Wasatch–Cache National Forest. The merged forest is based out of South Jordan, Utah. The Kamas Ranger District was merged with the Uinta National Forest's Heber Ranger District in Heber City.

The Cache National Forest portion is located in northern Utah and southern Idaho. It has a land area of 701,453 acres (1,096 sq mi, or 2,838.7 km2). In descending order of land area it is located in parts of Cache, Bear Lake, Franklin, Weber, Rich, Box Elder, Caribou, and Morgan counties. (Bear Lake, Franklin, and Caribou counties are in Idaho, with the rest being in Utah.) There are local ranger district offices located in Logan and Ogden.

The Wasatch National Forest portion is located in northeastern Utah and southwestern Wyoming. It has a land area of 905,724 acres (1,415.2 sq mi, or 3,365.3 km2). In descending order of land area it is located in parts of Summit, Tooele, Salt Lake, Davis, Uinta, Duchesne, Wasatch, Morgan, Utah, Weber, and Juab counties. (Uinta County is in Wyoming, with the rest being in Utah.) There are local ranger district offices located in Evanston and Mountain View in Wyoming, and in Kamas, and Salt Lake City in Utah.

Wilderness areas

Logan District
 Mount Naomi Wilderness at 
 Wellsville Mountain Wilderness at 

Kamas, Evanston and Mountain View Districts

Salt Lake District
 Mount Olympus Wilderness at 
 Twin Peaks Wilderness at 
 Deseret Peak Wilderness at

See also
 Hardware Ranch
 Harker Canyon
 List of U.S. national forests
 Peter Sinks
 Pfeifferhorn - The Little Matterhorn
 Tank Hollow Fire

References

External links

 USFS.gov: official Uinta-Wasatch–Cache National Forest website